Sabalan (Persian: سبلان ) is an inactive stratovolcano in Ardabil Province of northwestern Iran.

At  in elevation, it is the third-highest mountain in Iran. It has a permanent crater lake formed at its summit.

Mount Sabalan
Located in the extreme northwest of Iran, Sabalan is the country's third-highest peak after Damavand and Alam-Kuh. It is also slightly higher than Mont Blanc in the Alps.

The mountain offers many attractions throughout the year. On the slopes of the mountain, the mineral water from springs attracts large numbers of tourists each year, many of whom have faith in healing properties attributed to the springs. The nomadic people of the area live in small villages, with their round "Yurt" tents appealing to tourism. Sabalan has a ski resort (Alvares) and different tourist areas such as the Sarein spa. The mountain is known for its beautiful vistas, including the Shirvan gorge, where few climbers ever venture.

Geology
Sabalan is a large andesite stratovolcano in Meshgin Shahr, in Ardabil Province in Iran. It is the second-highest volcano after Mount Damavand. The volcano is quite old. Its first eruptions occurred in the Eocene and later in the Miocene. But the main volcanism happened in the Pliocene and the Pleistocene as some of its rocks have been dated to 5–1.4  million years. Some references state that volcanic activity continued into the Holocene, less than 10,000  years ago.

The summit region has several peaks exceeding , primarily along a southwest-northeast trending ridge. The highest point  is at the northeast end of the ridge and is separated from the + group of southwestern summits by a  col.

The mountain is located in a continental climate with hot, dry summers and extremely cold, snowy winters. Precipitation falls primarily as snow in late autumn, winter, and spring, and is sufficient to sustain seven glaciers near the summit above .

Climbing
The climbing surface includes rocks of various sizes (Class 2 scrambling), and a moderate degree of fitness is required to climb it. The climb from the base camp starts easy, becomes challenging midway, then eases in gradient near the top. The lake on the top remains frozen except for about four weeks in late July to early August.

Some climbers start by driving to hot springs of Meshgin Shahr, where they start their climb. This climb takes about two days, reaching the base camp on the first day. Others take a taxi to base camp early in the morning and climb the mountain in one day. In 2006, there was talk of improving the road to the base camp. If this is done, a regular car should be able to make it to the base camp during the climbing season. The road goes through multiple nomadic encampments of shepherds.

One or two days of acclimatization in Tehran or Ardabil may be advisable. Mountaineering has been popular among the youth in Iran. On a Friday during the climbing season (late June to mid-August), one may find hundreds of people on the mountain. Guides can also be found in Ardabil. Adequate climbing equipment can be purchased in Ardabil or Tehran.

Surrounding area
The area around Sabalan, particularly near Meshkin and Dasht-eh Moghan, produces large quantities of grain, including wheat. Due to the microclimate produced by the mountain, Ardabil remains pleasantly cool in the summers.

There are numerous hot springs around the slopes of Sabalan, with the main concentration within Sareyn County.

There are skiing slopes, with snow even in near-summer. A ski resort named "Alvares" is within an hour's drive from Sareyn on the south ridge of Sabalan.

Gallery

See also
 List of mountains in Iran
 List of volcanoes in Iran
 List of Ultras of West Asia

References 

 
 
 Peaklist.org: Iran Mountain Ultra-Prominence

Sources

External links

 Story of a climb to Mount Sabalan
 Hamed Tohidi's Blog about Mount Sabalan

Mountains of Iran
Mountaineering in Iran
Alborz (mountain range)
Landforms of Ardabil Province
Stratovolcanoes of Iran
Volcanic crater lakes
Four-thousanders of the Alborz
Mountains of Ardabil Province
Miocene stratovolcanoes
Pliocene stratovolcanoes
Pleistocene stratovolcanoes